Eichborndamm is a railway station in the Reinickendorf neighbourhood of the homonymous borough in Berlin. It is served by the S-Bahn line .

The station was called Eichbornstraße until 29 May 1994.

References

Schwandl, R (2003). "Berlin S-Bahn Album".

Railway stations in Berlin
Berlin S-Bahn stations
Buildings and structures in Reinickendorf
Railway stations in Germany opened in 1984